The following list is of gentlemen's clubs that operated in Canada. A gentlemen's club is a private social club that serves as places for men to dine, drink, read, and socialize. They originated in the 18th century as a type of British social institution and flourished particularly in the 19th century.

History 
As a part of the British Empire, Canadians adopted the gentlemen's club tradition enthusiastically. Most of Canada's clubs were founded during the Victorian era and used similar rules to their British counterparts, including: a proscription on discussions about politics and religion, silence in reading rooms, and a ban on smoking in dining areas. Moreover, clubs oriented towards businessmen prohibited briefcases in dining rooms.

Wallace Clement described Canada's gentlemen's clubs as "one of the key institutions which form an interacting and active national upper class." Clement listed the six most important clubs as the National, York, Toronto, Mount Royal, St James, and Rideau.

By the 1970s, gentlemen's clubs had started to decline in prestige and importance. Several factors contributed to this decline. During the preceding decade, Canada had begun to abandon its British culture, traditions, and symbols. Bryan Palmer described this process as a shift in "self-conception away from an age-old attachment to empire, in which comfort could be taken from a prideful understanding of keeping alive European traditions." As quintessentially British institutions, gentlemen's clubs suffered from this transformation. Another reason was that the baby boomer generation that had come of age during the countercultural revolution was skeptical of authority, tradition, and formality, all of which gentlemen's clubs embodied. Consequently, baby boomers joined private clubs in far smaller numbers than preceding generations. Finally, changes to Canadian tax law forbade members from writing off club dues as business expenses.

In his 1975 tome The Canadian Establishment, author and journalist Peter C. Newman devoted a chapter to gentlemen's clubs, entitled "Clubland on the Rocks." Newman described the generational change that was leading to the decline in clubs, saying,Not so very long ago, at lunchtime on any given weekday, the nation's Establishment conducted most of its charitable, commercial, and political liaisons inside club dining rooms. This is no longer true. The new-breed wheelers are dealing downtown in the smart places where they can sniff out the fast money, looking past their luncheon companions' shoulders to see who's breaking bread with their competitors.By the 1980s, many clubs were struggling financially. These financial difficulties, coupled with pressure from feminists who opposed all-male clubs, led all of Canada's gentlemen's clubs to cease operating as such and begin accepting female members. During the following decades many clubs continued to struggle attracting new members. Since 1985, eight clubs have closed, merged, or reformed. Today, Canada's former gentlemen's clubs function mostly as business and networking institutions. Along with moving to a mixed-sex format, most clubs have adopted more casual dress and behavioural codes.

List of clubs

See also 

 Gentlemen's club
 List of gentlemen's clubs in India
 List of gentlemen's clubs in London
 List of gentlemen's clubs in Sri Lanka
 List of gentlemen's clubs in the United States

References 

 
Lists of organizations based in Canada
Canada history-related lists
Canada